is a group of the Japan Air Self-Defense Force based at Miho Air Base in Tottori Prefecture. It is sometimes referred to as the 3rd Tactical Airlift Wing.

It consists of two squadrons:
 403rd Tactical Airlift Squadron (Kawasaki C-1 & Kawasaki C-2)
 41st Flight Training Squadron (T-400)

References

Units of the Japan Air Self-Defense Force